Samples is a surname. People with the surname include:

Ed Samples (1921–1991), pioneering American stock car driver
Jim Samples (born 1963), American businessman and media executive
John Samples (fl. 1970s–2020s), American political theorist and author
Junior Samples (1926–1983), American comedian
Keith Samples (fl. 1990s–2010s), American filmmaker
Mike Samples (born 1950), professional Canadian football player
Pete Samples (fl. 2000s–2010s), name of Canadian musician Brent Freedman

See also
Sample (surname)